Linux XP was a Fedora Linux-based shareware Linux distribution designed to imitate Windows environment using GNOME desktop; it could run some Microsoft Windows programs using the Wine compatibility layer. Linux XP had to be registered within 99 startups after installation, or the OS would deactivate.

See also 

 Linux adoption
 Windows XP
 Fedora
 ReactOS

References

External links 
 
 

RPM-based Linux distributions
Shareware
Linux distributions